Arthur Jones, 2nd Viscount Ranelagh (died 1669) was an Irish peer and politician who sat in both the Irish House of Commons and the English House of Commons.

Jones was the son of Roger Jones, 1st Viscount Ranelagh and his wife Frances Moore, daughter of Sir Garret Moore, eventual 1st Viscount Moore of Drogheda.

He was Member of Parliament for  Sligo Borough from 1634 to 1635 in the Parliament of Ireland. In November 1640, Jones was elected to the Long Parliament as MP for Weobley in the Parliament of England. but was disabled from sitting in 1643. He succeeded to the titles of Baron Jones of Navan, and Viscount Ranelagh on the death of his father in 1643.
 
In 1630 Jones married Katherine Boyle, the 15-year-old daughter of the Earl of Cork. Her brothers included the chemist Robert Boyle and  Lord Broghill, the later Earl of Orrery who was a prominent politician in Cromwellian and Restoration times. They had 3 daughters and a son, Richard, who was created Earl of Ranelagh.

References

Year of birth missing
1669 deaths
Irish MPs 1634–1635
English MPs 1640–1648
Viscounts in the Peerage of Ireland
Members of the Privy Council of Ireland